= Vilnius Curling Cup =

Akropolis Vilnius Curling Cup – international curling tournament, held every year in Lithuania's capital city of Vilnius. Competition started at 2005.

== Results ==
Event	Gold	Silver	Bronze
2005			
2006			
2007			
2008			
2009	(Russia) Medved	(Russia) Koening Curling Club	(Russia) Albatros
2010	(Russia) Adamant-2	(Lithuania) Snaikas Curling Club	(Latvia) Akords
